{{safesubst:#invoke:RfD|||month = March
|day = 15
|year = 2023
|time = 17:54
|timestamp = 20230315175456

|content=
REDIRECT Exam#Final examination

}}